Sky Above and Mud Beneath, also released as The Sky Above –The Mud Below, is a 1961 French documentary film. It won the Academy Award for Best Documentary Feature and was entered into the 1961 Cannes Film Festival.

The film documented a 7-month, thousand-mile Franco-Dutch expedition led by Pierre-Dominique Gaisseau, into uncharted territories of what was then Netherlands New Guinea.  The expedition began in the northern region of the Asmat.  The group interacted with tribes of cannibals, headhunters and Pygmies; battled leeches, hunger, and exhaustion; and “discovered” and named the Princess Marijke River, named after Princess Maria Christina (Marijke) of the Netherlands.

Cast
 Pierre-Dominique Gaisseau - team leader
 Gérard Delloye - co-leader
 Herve de Maigret - radio operator
 Jan Sneep - liaison officer
 Tony Saulnier-Ciolkkowski- photographer
 William Peacock - Narrator (English version)

See also

References

External links
 

1961 films
1960s French-language films
French documentary films
Best Documentary Feature Academy Award winners
Films directed by Pierre Dominique Gaisseau
1961 documentary films
Headhunting accounts and studies
Western New Guinea
1960s French films
Works about Western New Guinea